Counting Down the Days is the third studio album by Australian singer Natalie Imbruglia. It was released by Brightside Recordings on 4 April 2005 in the United Kingdom. Her debut with the label, Imbruglia reteamed with Gary Clark to work on her next project, but also consulted a wider range of producers to collaborate with her, including Eg White, Martin Harrington, Ben Hillier, Ash Howes, Daniel Johns, David Kosten, Stephen Lipson, Paul Mac, and Ian Stanley.

Upon release, Counting Down the Days entered the UK Albums Chart at number one, selling over 40,000 copies in its first week. Imbruglia's highest-charting release there, it was eventually certified gold by the British Phonographic Industry (BPI), indicating sales in excess of 100,000 units. Elsewhere, the album entered the top ten in Italy and Switzerland, while reaching the top 20 in Australia and Ireland. Counting Down the Days produced two singles, "Shiver" and "Counting Down the Days". It was released digitally in the United States on 7 September 2010, but has never received a formal physical release in the country.

Critical reception

Allmusic editor Jon O'Brien found that the album suggested "a confusing and disappointing change in direction. For all the bittersweet melancholy and dark undertones of White Lilies Island suggested an interesting career ahead, yet only on a few occasions does Counting Down the Days veer into this territory. Instead, the majority is made up of fairly inoffensive radio-friendly pop songs [...] Counting Down the Days will undoubtedly be a commercial success but its play-it-safe attitude undoes some of the good work done by its predecessor. A few more risks next time wouldn't go amiss." Betty Clarke, writing for The Guardian, felt that "Revisiting the mid-tempo rhythms of her last album, Imbruglia turns from muse to troubled girl next door, gushing about love and fretting about voices in her head, while acoustic guitars, flutes and strings whip a radio-friendly pop froth around her. Bored with pushing perfection, she's selling an old-fashioned brand of submission, her feisty edge eroded to a disturbing gratefulness. [...] Imbruglia's voice sounds better than ever – hanging on to words as if she's rolling out an expensive carpet."

Track listing 
Credits adapted from the album's liner notes. 

Notes
 signifies a co-producer
 signifies an initial producer

Personnel 
Credits adapted from the album's liner notes

 Natalie Imbruglia – lead vocals (all tracks), art direction
 Ash Howes – mixing (tracks 1–5, 8, 9, 11), production (tracks 1, 5, 8, 9), co-production (tracks 2, 11), keyboard (tracks 5, 8), bass (track 1)
 Martin Harrington – production (tracks 1, 5, 8, 9), co-production (tracks 2, 11), keyboard (tracks 1, 8), piano & acoustic guitar (track 5)
 Eg White – keyboard & guitar (tracks 2, 6), production, engineering, mixing, programming, drums & bass (track 6)
 Gary Clark – production, engineering, guitar & strings (track 11), initial production (track 7)
 Keith Uddin – engineering (tracks 1, 5, 8, 9, 11), mix engineering (tracks 3, 4), additional engineering (track 2)
 Pete Davis – programming & keyboard (tracks 1, 5, 8, 9)
 Rej Rheinallt ap Gwynedd – bass (tracks 2, 4, 7–10)
 Chuck Sabo – drums (tracks 1, 2, 4, 7, 10)
 Stephen Lipson – production, programming, keyboard, mandolin & guitar (track 2)
 Peredur ap Gwynedd – guitar (tracks 2, 4, 7, 8, 10)
 Daniel Johns – production & backing vocals (tracks 3, 4), guitar (track 3)
 David Kosten – production, mixing, programming, keyboard & strings (track 12)
 Ben Hillier – production, mixing, piano & dulcimer (track 10)
 Seton Daunt – guitar (tracks 1, 5, 8)
 Paul Mac – production, piano & keyboard (track 3)
 Kenny Dickenson – piano (tracks 4, 9), keyboard (track 4)
 John Themis – acoustic guitar (track 1), ethnic instruments (track 7)
 Kim Moyes – drums & glockenspiel (track 3)
 Geoff Dugmore – drums (tracks 5, 8)
 Richard Morris – production assistance & mixing assistance (track 10)
 Heff Moraes – engineering (track 2)
 Rick Willson – guitar (track 2)
 Anton Hagop – engineering (track 3)
 James Haselwood – bass (track 3)
 Julian Hamilton – keyboard (track 3)
 Reece Gilmore – Pro Tools editing (track 3)
 Chris Brown – engineering (track 4)
 Izzy Dunn – cello (track 4)
 Petra Jean Phillipson – backing vocals (track 4)
 Katch Koffee – backing vocals (track 4)
 Richard Jones – bass (track 5)
 Ian Stanley – production (track 7)
 Dave Bascombe – mixing (track 7)
 Danton Supple – engineering (track 7)
 Neil Taylor – guitar (track 7)
 Alison Clark – backing vocals (track 7)
 John Greswell – mandolin (track 10)
 John Sundry – guitar (track 12)
 Drusilla Harris – violin (track 12)
 Roma – art direction
 Steve Stacey – design
 Hugh Goldsmith – A&R
 Andy Stephens Management – management
 Dean Freeman – photography

Charts

Weekly charts

Year-end charts

Certifications

Release history

References

External links
 Counting Down the Days - Press release

Natalie Imbruglia albums
2005 albums
Albums produced by Stephen Lipson
Albums produced by Ian Stanley